Amblygnathus is a genus of beetles in the family Carabidae, containing the following species:

 Amblygnathus bicolor Ball & Maddison, 1987 
 Amblygnathus braziliensis Ball & Maddison, 1987 
 Amblygnathus cephalotes Dejena, 1829 
 Amblygnathus corvinus Dejean, 1829 
 Amblygnathus darlingtoni Ball & Maddison, 1987 
 Amblygnathus evansi Ball & Maddison, 1987 
 Amblygnathus fricki Ball & Maddison, 1987 
 Amblygnathus geminatus Ball & Maddison, 1987 
 Amblygnathus gigas Ball & Maddison, 1987 
 Amblygnathus gilvipes Ball & Maddison, 1987 
 Amblygnathus interior Ball & Maddison, 1987 
 Amblygnathus iripennis Say, 1823 
 Amblygnathus janthinus Dejean, 1829 
 Amblygnathus lucidus Dejean, 1829 
 Amblygnathus mexicanus Bates, 1882 
 Amblygnathus panamensis Ball & Maddison, 1987 
 Amblygnathus puncicollis Putzeys, 1878 
 Amblygnathus reichardti Ball & Maddison, 1987 
 Amblygnathus subtinctus Leconte, 1866 
 Amblygnathus suturalis Putzeys, 1845 
 Amblygnathus tikal Ball & Maddison, 1987 
 Amblygnathus whiteheadi Ball & Maddison, 1987 
 Amblygnathus woodruffi Ball & Maddison, 1987 
 Amblygnathus xingu Ball & Maddison, 1987

References

Harpalinae